= Bimbo Ogunnowo =

Nigerian actress and cosmetologist

Ogunnowo Taiwo Oladuni is a Nigerian actress and a cosmetologist. Her first film is Ifejafunmi.

== Filmography ==
- Ifejafunmi
- Ebute
- Gucci Girls

== Personal life ==
In 2018, the actress married Nigerian movie producer Okiki Afolayan.
